Admiral Sir Richard Fortescue Phillimore,  (23 December 1864 – 8 November 1940) was a Royal Navy officer who served as Commander-in-Chief, Plymouth from 1923 to 1926.

Naval career
Phillimore was born at Boconnoc in Cornwall on 23 December 1864, the son of Admiral Sir Augustus Phillimore, and educated at Westminster School. He joined the Royal Navy in 1878, was promoted to lieutenant on 20 August 1886, and to commander on 1 January 1899.

Phillimore served in the First World War, resuming command of HMS Inflexible in 1914, and then as Principal Beach Master for the landings at Cape Helles in the Dardanelles in April 1915. He went on to be liaison officer to the Imperial Russian Headquarters in 1915 and commander of the 1st Battlecruiser Squadron of the Grand Fleet in 1916. He was then made Admiral commanding the Aircraft of the Grand Fleet in 1917, and took part in Second Battle of Heligoland Bight in November that year.

After the war, Phillimore was appointed President of the Postwar Questions Committee and then commanded the Reserve Fleet from 1920. He was made Commander-in-Chief, Plymouth in 1923. He was First and Principal Naval Aide-de-Camp to King George V from 1928, and retired in 1929.

Phillimore is buried at Shedfield in Hampshire.

Family
In 1905 he married Violet Turton; they had three sons and one daughter.

References

External links
 

|-

|-

|-

1864 births
1940 deaths
People educated at Westminster School, London
Royal Navy admirals of World War I
Knights Grand Cross of the Order of the Bath
Knights Commander of the Order of St Michael and St George
Members of the Royal Victorian Order
People from Cornwall
People from Botley, Hampshire
Military personnel from Cornwall